Paul Vincent Davis may refer to:

 Paul Davis (footballer, born 1961), English footballer
 Paul Vincent Davis (puppeteer) (born 1935), American puppeteer